Niphidium crassifolium, commonly known as the graceful fern, is a species of fern in the family Polypodiaceae found in Central and South America. It is predominantly epiphytic, growing on other plants—for example, in the canopies of trees—but occasionally grows on rocks or on the ground, particularly at higher altitude. It has a rhizome from which many fine rootlets covered in dark reddish-brown scales grow. Together they form a root basket that, when growing on trees, helps to trap leaf litter and dust, forming a nutrient-rich soil that holds water. The sori are round and large, occurring in single rows between veins at the far end of the leaf.

Taxonomy

N. crassifolium was first described by Carl Linnaeus in 1753 as Polypodium crassifolium. In 1972, David B. Lellinger moved the species into the genus Niphidium. It can be difficult to distinguish from N. albopunctatissimum, but that species has narrower leaves and is mostly found growing on rocks or on the ground, as well as occupying a different range.

Distribution
Niphidium crassifolium is found in Central and South America, from Mexico in the north to Peru in the south and including Panama, Ecuador, Peru, Brazil, French Guiana, Guyana and the West Indies. According to Thomas Croat, it is probably the most common fern found on Barro Colorado Island, Panama. Niphidium crassifolium is known to grow on Socratea exorrhiza, occurring on 12% of individuals on Barro Colorado Island. It is also known to grow on Platypodium elegans, Ceiba pentandra, Tabebuia guayacan and Anacardium excelsum.

Biochemistry
This species uses crassulacean acid metabolism (CAM), whereby it stores some carbon dioxide produced by respiration at night and releases this for use in photosynthesis the next day, but the overall contribution of this is small compared to that of true CAM plants such as cacti. Under drought stress, the contribution of CAM increases from 2.7% of total carbon fixation to 10%. The production of gametophytes is determined by light levels rather than by a hormone.

Uses
N. crassifolium can be cultivated, growing well in well-drained soil under medium light. In Northern Peru the fresh stem is used in traditional medicine to treat inflammation of internal organs.

References

Further reading

External links
Photographs of Niphidium crassifolium from Saint Lucia

Polypodiaceae
Ferns of the Americas
Flora of Central America
Flora of northern South America
Flora of western South America
Ferns of Brazil
Ferns of Ecuador
Ferns of Mexico
Plants described in 1753
Taxa named by Carl Linnaeus